Tetrahydrofolic acid (THFA), or tetrahydrofolate, is a folic acid derivative.

Metabolism

Human synthesis
Tetrahydrofolic acid is produced from dihydrofolic acid by dihydrofolate reductase. This reaction is inhibited by methotrexate.

It is converted into 5,10-methylenetetrahydrofolate by serine hydroxymethyltransferase.

Bacterial synthesis
Many bacteria use dihydropteroate synthetase to produce dihydropteroate, a molecule without function in humans. This makes it a useful target for sulfonamide antibiotics, which compete with the PABA precursor.

Functions
Tetrahydrofolic acid is a cofactor in many reactions, especially in the synthesis (or anabolism) of amino acids and nucleic acids. In addition, it serves as a carrier molecule for single-carbon moieties, that is, groups containing one carbon atom e.g. methyl, methylene, methenyl, formyl, or formimino. When combined with one such single-carbon moiety as in 10-formyltetrahydrofolate, it acts as a donor of a group with one carbon atom. Tetrahydrofolate gets this extra carbon atom by sequestering formaldehyde produced in other processes. These single-carbon moieties are important in the formation of precursors for DNA synthesis. A shortage in tetrahydrofolic acid (FH4) can cause megaloblastic anemia.

Methotrexate acts on dihydrofolate reductase, like pyrimethamine or trimethoprim, as an inhibitor and thus reduces the amount of tetrahydrofolate made. This may result in megaloblastic anemia.

Tetrahydrofolic acid is involved in the conversion of formiminoglutamic acid to glutamic acid; this may reduce the amount of histidine available for decarboxylation and protein synthesis, and hence the urinary histamine and formiminoglutamic acid may be decreased.

References

External links
 Tetrahydrofolate bound to proteins in the PDB

Folates
Coenzymes